Richard Tompkins Kollmar (December 31, 1910 – January 7, 1971), also known professionally as Dick Kollmar, was an American stage, radio, film and television actor, television personality and Broadway producer. Kollmar was the husband of journalist Dorothy Kilgallen.

Early life
Kollmar was born to Mr. and Mrs. John Kollmar. His great-great-grandfather was Daniel D. Tompkins, the fourth governor of New York and the sixth vice president of the United States. When Kollmar was an infant, the family moved to Ridgewood, New Jersey, where his father worked as an architect. Kollmar attended Tusculum College, where he became interested in acting, and he performed in the school's glee club and was the editor of the school newspaper. Upon graduation, he enrolled at the Yale School of Drama but dropped out after winning a role on a radio drama.

Career
After moving to New York City and procuring steady work on radio commercials, Kollmar appeared in the Broadway plays Knickerbocker Holiday (1938) and Too Many Girls (1939). Kollmar, along with Cy Walter and Jimmy Dobson, composed the song I’ll Never Tire of You. It was performed by the Sam Donahue Orchestra on November 12, 1941 during a recording session at Bluebird Records.

After becoming a Broadway producer, Kollmar hired Fats Waller to compose the 1943 musical Early to Bed. This episode in Kollmar's career was recalled in a 2016 essay about Waller by John McWhorter, an American academic and linguist who is associate professor of English and Comparative Literature at Columbia University. Even as late as 1943, the idea of a black composer writing the score for a standard-issue white show was unheard of. When Broadway performer and producer Richard Kollmar began planning Early to Bed, his original idea was for Waller to perform in it as a comic character, not to write the music. Waller was, after all, as much a comedian as a musician. ...

Kollmar's original choice for composer [of Early to Bed] was Ferde Grofé, best known as the orchestrator of George Gershwin's "Rhapsody in Blue," whose signature compositions were portentous concert suites. But Grofé withdrew, and it is to Kollmar's credit that he realized that he had a top-rate pop-song composer available in Waller. Waller's double duty as composer and performer was short-lived. During a cash crisis and in an advanced state of intoxication, Waller threatened to leave the production unless Kollmar bought the rights to his Early to Bed music for $1,000. (This was typical of Waller, who often sold melodies for quick cash when in his cups. The evidence suggests, for example, that the standards "I Can't Give You Anything but Love" and "On the Sunny Side of the Street" were Waller tunes.) Waller came to his senses the next day, but Kollmar decided that his drinking habits made him too risky a proposition for eight performances a week. From then on, Waller was the show's composer only, with lyrics by George Marion.

In the early 1940s, Kollmar portrayed the role of Dennis Pierce on the radio series Pretty Kitty Kelly on CBS Radio. From 1945 to 1950, Kollmar portrayed Boston Blackie on the radio program of the same name on the Mutual Broadcasting System. He also had lead roles in other radio shows including Gang Busters, Grand Central Station and the soap opera Bright Horizon.

In April 1945, Kollmar and his newspaper-columnist wife Dorothy Kilgallen (whom he had married in April 1940) began hosting a 45-minute talk radio show called Breakfast with Dorothy and Dick. The program aired Monday through Friday on WOR and was broadcast live from the couple's 16-room Park Avenue apartment. Over breakfast, served by their butler Julius, Kollmar and Kilgallen talked about New York City entertainment, sports, celebrity gossip and the city's nightclub scene. Their two children, Richard, Jr. ("Dickie") and Jill, often made appearances. Breakfast with Dorothy and Dick was broadcast locally throughout New York City and its suburbs, drawing an audience of 20 million listeners. In January 1953, the Kollmar family moved from their Park Avenue apartment to a five-story townhouse on Manhattan's East 68th Street,     and their radio series began originating from there. Breakfast with Dorothy and Dick ceased production on March 21, 1963.

In 1948, Kollmar made his first and only film appearance in the low-budget crime drama Close-Up, directed by Jack Donohue. He played the supporting role of a Nazi war criminal who lived in hiding in the United States. In June 1949, Kollmar began hosting the live television variety series Broadway Spotlight. The series, which aired on NBC, was canceled in September 1949. Throughout the early to mid-1950s, Kollmar continued his career as an actor with guest roles on television.

In 1952, Kollmar became the master of ceremonies for the DuMont Television Network game show Guess What?, which aired from July 8, 1952, to August 26, 1952, though no kinescopes of the show exist.

From 1952 to 1965, Kollmar made five appearances on the game show What's My Line?, on which his wife was a regular panelist. Kollmar appeared once as an occupational guest, twice as part of a group of mystery guests and twice as a panelist. His appearance as a panelist on July 6, 1952, has been lost; the mystery guest on the lost episode was actor Dane Clark.

In addition to his work in radio and television, Kollmar produced and directed several Broadway stage musicals. Early to Bed ran from June 17, 1943 to May 13, 1944. Kollmar produced and directed the fantasy musical Dream with Music that premiered on May 19, 1944. The cast included ballerina Vera Zorina. The story was written by Kollmar's wife Dorothy, Sidney Sheldon and Ben Roberts. Dream with Music was praised for its ballet sequences, but critics' reviews were otherwise negative. It closed after 28 performances. Kollmar fared better with other Broadway productions including the hits By Jupiter, Are You With It? and Plain and Fancy. Plain and Fancy ran on Broadway from January 27, 1955 to March 3, 1956.

In 1958, Kollmar produced The Body Beautiful, a musical about prize fighters starring Steve Forrest, singers Lonnie Sattin and Barbara McNair (in their Broadway debuts), Mindy Carson and Jack Warden. He hired two newcomers, lyricist Sheldon Harnick and composer Jerry Bock, a team who would later write the lyrics and music for the hit shows Fiddler on the Roof and Fiorello!. Upon its debut on January 23, 1958, critics' reviews of The Body Beautiful were generally mixed. However, more influential critics panned the show and the music (though two songs, "All of These and More" and "Summer Is," became standards). The New Yorker called the show "vulgar and feeble minded in equal degrees." The Body Beautiful failed to attract an audience and closed in March 1958 after 60 performances. It was the last show that Kollmar would produce.

When not busy with acting and producing, Kollmar operated a supper club called The Left Bank at 309 West 50th Street in Manhattan. 

He was also involved in the arts community, working with the Art Students League of New York and operating galleries during two different phases of his career.  In 1952, his gallery called "The Little Studio" opened and was publicized several times by the New York Journal-American where his wife Dorothy Kilgallen was employed. A year and a few months after she died, "the Pastiche" opened on East 53rd Street in midtown Manhattan.  The Sunday edition of the New York Daily News gave it prominent attention, including photos of Kollmar posing with artwork, on February 12, 1967.  Kollmar knew about Pop art but refused to display any of it, explaining, "I have a theory that the only honest and pure abstract art is by children between the ages of 3 and 6."

Before the 1965 death of Kollmar's first wife Dorothy Kilgallen, his nightclub The Left Bank closed permanently. In the last months of her life, he did not have a nightclub or art gallery, was unemployed and his living expenses were paid entirely by her.

Personal life
Kollmar was married twice and had three children. On April 6, 1940, he married Dorothy Kilgallen at St. Vincent Ferrer Church in Manhattan. The couple had three children: Richard, Jr., (born 1941) Jill (born 1943) and Kerry (born 1954). Kerry was later confirmed to be the child of an affair with the singer Johnnie Ray, which Kilgallen eventually admitted to her husband. Kilgallen was capable of achieving much more in her multiple careers than her husband achieved in his.  People who socialized with the couple gravitated toward her high intelligence.  This took a heavy emotional toll on Kollmar, but they remained married until her death in November 1965. Those who attended her funeral included fashion designer Anne Fogarty, whom Kollmar married in June 1967. They remained married until his death.

In 1967 and early 1968, Kollmar, Fogarty and Kerry Kollmar lived in a penthouse on Manhattan's East 72nd Street. He commuted to and from his East 53rd Street art gallery called the Pastiche.  In the spring of 1968, Kollmar and Fogarty purchased the same East 68th Street townhouse where he had lived with his first wife Dorothy Kilgallen and Kerry. The couple made renovations that included tearing down walls, rebuilding hallways and setting up a studio for Fogarty to design clothes. They leased the ground floor to two ophthalmologists who opened a practice there. How long the Pastiche lasted is unknown. In 1969 or 1970, Richard Kollmar disowned Kerry, who was 15 or 16.  Kerry lived with friends and in foster homes until he became a legal adult, by which time Richard was dead.

Death
On January 7, 1971, Kollmar died at the Manhattan townhouse where he lived with his wife Anne Fogarty. Newspaper reports stated that he "... died in his sleep late Thursday [January 7] in his New York home." According to his friends, Kollmar had broken his shoulder while falling at home three days before his death.

His funeral was held on January 9 at St. Vincent Ferrer Church in Manhattan. Kollmar is buried at the Gate of Heaven Cemetery in Hawthorne, New York.

Broadway credits

Filmography

References

Footnotes

External links
 
 

1910 births
1971 deaths
20th-century American businesspeople
20th-century American male actors
American game show hosts
American male film actors
American male musical theatre actors
American male radio actors
American male stage actors
American male television actors
American theatre directors
American theatre managers and producers
Burials at Gate of Heaven Cemetery (Hawthorne, New York)
Male actors from New York City
People from Ridgewood, New Jersey
People from Brooklyn
Tusculum University alumni
Yale School of Drama alumni
20th-century American singers
20th-century American male singers
Singers from New York City